Thomas Bryan Martin (1731–1798) was an 18th-century English American land agent, justice, legislator, and planter in the colony (and later U.S. state) of Virginia and in present-day West Virginia. Martin was the land agent of the Northern Neck Proprietary for his uncle Thomas Fairfax, 6th Lord Fairfax of Cameron (1693–1781) and served two terms in the House of Burgesses.

Martin was born in Kent in 1731, and was the grandson of Thomas Fairfax, 5th Lord Fairfax of Cameron (1657–1710) through his mother, Frances Fairfax Martin. Martin resided with his uncle on their frontier Greenway Court estate in present-day Clarke County, Virginia. He earned the affections of Lord Fairfax on account of his energetic nature and loyalty, and through Martin's growing influence Lord Fairfax relocated the proprietary's base of operations to Greenway Court in 1762 and made Martin steward and land agent of the proprietary.

Martin took an active role in political and civil affairs within the proprietary's domain. He served as a vestryman for the Anglican Frederick Parish, and upon the creation of Hampshire County in 1754, he presided as the county's first justice and was further appointed the County Lieutenant. He later represented Hampshire County in the House of Burgesses from 1756 to 1758 and serving with George Washington, represented Frederick County from 1758 until 1761. Martin was appointed a trustee of the frontier towns of Winchester, Stephensburg (present-day Stephens City), and Bath (present-day Berkeley Springs). He was also appointed as the colonel of the Frederick County militia. Though not in the best of health, Martin was relied upon by the settlers of the proprietary to use his considerable resources in response to Native American attacks. Following the outbreak of the American Revolutionary War, Martin refused reappointment by Governor Patrick Henry as a justice of the Frederick County Commission of Peace. Afterward, Martin retreated from civil service entirely, and retired to Greenway Court.

He maintained a low profile during the war, and his uncle Lord Fairfax was treated with respect and consideration despite being the only resident peer in the American colonies. Following the death of Lord Fairfax in 1781, Martin's brother Reverend Denny Martin Fairfax inherited the Northern Neck Proprietary, and Martin was given the Greenway Court estate. He took his uncle's housekeeper Mrs. Crawford as his mistress and died unmarried in 1798. Martin bequeathed his Greenway Court estate and an adjoining  to his housekeeper Betsy Powers. Martin's brother Denny Fairfax was unable to properly maintain the proprietary and conveyed the remaining lands in 1797, thus terminating the Fairfax and Martin families' interests in the proprietary before it was formally dissolved in 1806. The city of Martinsburg, West Virginia, was named for Martin by his friend Adam Stephen.

Early life and family 

Thomas Bryan Martin was born in Kent, England, in 1731 and was the son of Denny Martin (1695–1762) of Salts Manor and his wife Frances Fairfax Martin (1703–1791). His father and mother married in Loose, Kent. Martin's mother was the daughter of Thomas Fairfax, 5th Lord Fairfax of Cameron (1657–1710) and his wife Catherine Colepeper Fairfax, and thus a sister of Thomas Fairfax, 6th Lord Fairfax of Cameron (1693–1781) and Robert Fairfax, 7th Lord Fairfax of Cameron (1707–1793). His grandmother Catherine Colepeper Fairfax was the daughter of Thomas Colepeper, 2nd Baron Colepeper and his wife Margaretta van Hesse, who was from a Dutch noble family. Martin was named in honor of his uncle Thomas. He was baptized into the Anglican faith as "Thomas Brian" in Loose on April 11, 1731. Martin and his siblings were raised amid humble surroundings in England. He had seven siblings, including four brothers and three sisters:
 Edward Martin (1723–1775)
 John Martin (1724–1746)
 Reverend Denny Martin (later Fairfax, 1725–1800)
 Frances Martin (1727–1813)
 Sibylla Martin (1729–1816)
 Philip Martin (1733–1821)
 Anna Susanna Martin (1736–1817)

Northern Neck Proprietary administration 

Martin's uncle Thomas Fairfax, 6th Lord Fairfax of Cameron (known as Lord Fairfax) owned the Northern Neck Proprietary land grant, which he had inherited from Martin's great-grandfather Thomas Colepeper, 2nd Baron Colepeper in 1719. The Northern Neck Proprietary had been awarded by the exiled Charles II of England to seven of his supporters in 1649, and again in 1688 by official patent. One of these seven supporters, Lord Colepeper, acquired the right to the entire proprietary in 1681, and his grandson, Lord Fairfax, inherited the land grant upon the death of his mother, Katherine Colepeper. Lord Fairfax dispatched his first cousin William Fairfax (1691–1757) to replace Robert Carter I as the steward and land agent for the Northern Neck Proprietary, a position in which Fairfax served until his death in 1757. In 1750, Martin's uncle Lord Fairfax established himself at his hunting plantation Greenway Court estate near present-day White Post in Clarke County with the intention of administering the proprietary himself. Lord Fairfax had previously reserved this land as his private residence in 1747, then known as "the Quarter". With his cousin William Fairfax acting as land agent, Lord Fairfax sought additional assistance in managing the proprietary and scrutinized which of his family members from England would be up to the task. Lord Fairfax first considered his brother Robert, then his brother-in-law Denny Martin, and in 1751, he finally decided upon enlisting the assistance of his twenty-year-old nephew and Denny Martin's son, Thomas Bryan Martin.

Lord Fairfax sent for Martin, who arrived in Virginia from England aboard the Hatley on May 24, 1751, accompanied by William Fairfax, who had been seeking an appointment to a position in England. Martin and Fairfax arrived in Williamsburg, where they dined with Fairfax's fellow Virginia Governor's Council member John Blair, Sr., and visited the Governor's Palace and the Capitol before beginning their journey toward the Northern Neck on May 31. Following his arrival at the Northern Neck Proprietary, Martin settled at Greenway Court with his uncle that autumn. Due to his humble upbringing, Martin quickly adapted to frontier life at Greenway Court. He soon earned the affections of Lord Fairfax on account of his energetic nature, his loyalty, and his good eyesight, which greatly assisted his myopic uncle. Greenway Court had taken its name from the Culpeper family's manor in Kent.

Desiring a larger role for himself in the proprietary's administration, Martin sought to influence his uncle into reorganizing the management of the proprietary. Prior to this move, a small land office had been in operation at Greenway Court. Following William Fairfax's death in 1757, his son George William Fairfax (1729–1787) had succeeded him as steward and land agent of the proprietary. Martin succeeded Fairfax as the steward and land agent of the proprietary in 1762. Fairfax's replacement by Martin, the transfer of the land office and Martin's increased influence over Lord Fairfax caused bitter feelings from George William Fairfax, as evidenced by his letters during this period. Fairfax and his wife Sally Cary Fairfax returned to England in 1773 prior to the American Revolutionary War and did not return afterward.

While residing at Greenway Court, Martin would have preferred more comfortable quarters than the rustic estate, as their living situation there was originally supposed to have been only temporary until the construction of a grander estate. In 1767, Martin wrote that plans for further construction and improvements at Greenway Court "remain in status quo and in quo state they are likely to remain, ...we are building castles, tho' not on earth where one is greatly wanted, but castles in the air." Martin's uncle Robert Fairfax remarked on the primitive life at Greenway Court among "strange, brutish people... past all conception". For the next thirty years, until Lord Fairfax's death in 1781, Martin remained at Greenway Court and shared in the loneliness and solitude of his "self-exiled" uncle. While established at Greenway Court, Martin engaged in agricultural pursuits. In 1768, Martin described tobacco as the crop "which is our all". Like many other planters and farmers in the Shenandoah Valley, Martin had transitioned to the farming of wheat by 1792, at which time he wrote to his brother in England, "Are you all starving that you give such prices for our flour; farming is now my object."

Political and civic affairs 
In addition to his management of the proprietary, Martin began taking an active role in political and civil affairs within his uncle's domain. Following an act of the Virginia General Assembly in February 1752, the Anglican Frederick Parish was authorized to hold an election for twelve parish vestrymen before June 15 of that year. Martin was elected as a vestryman, alongside his uncle Lord Fairfax and Gabriel Jones. Martin and his fellow vestrymen set about expanding and enlarging the Anglican presence within the parish.

In 1754, upon the creation of Hampshire County, Martin presided as the inaugural justice of the county's court. Under the act establishing the county, the first county court was to have been held in June 1754; however, the first court was not held until December 1757. The first court to be held was, in addition to Martin, composed of justices James Simpson, William Miller, Solomon Hedges, and Nathaniel Kuykendall with Gabriel Jones serving as the Clerk of Court. In 1755, Martin was further appointed as the County Lieutenant of Hampshire County. Martin was then elected alongside Thomas Walker to the House of Burgesses representing Hampshire County from 1768 to 1758. In 1758, Martin and George Washington challenged the incumbents and ran for election to represent Frederick County in the House of Burgesses against Hugh West and Thomas Swearingen. Martin and Washington received considerable support from Lord Fairfax, and the leading Anglican cleric in Frederick County, William Meldrum. Washington received the most votes with 310, followed by Martin with 240 votes, 199 votes for West, and 45 votes for Swearingen. Martin and Washington served alongside one another representing Frederick County until 1761. Martin chose not to run for reelection and retired from legislative politics in 1761.

In September 1758, the Virginia General Assembly appointed Martin as one of the trustees of Winchester. Martin was further appointed as a trustee of the town of Stephensburg (present-day Stephens City). His uncle Lord Fairfax, John Hite, Gabriel Jones, Robert Rutherford, Lewis Stephens, and James Wood were also appointed trustees of the towns alongside Martin. When the town of Bath (present-day Berkeley Springs) received its charter from the Virginia General Assembly in October 1776, Martin was appointed as a trustee alongside Bryan Fairfax, Philip Pendleton, Robert Rutherford, Samuel Washington, Warner Washington, Alexander White, and others.

Martin was also appointed as the colonel of the Frederick County militia. While Martin was not in the best of health, he could be relied upon by the settlers of the proprietary to use his considerable resources to act promptly during an emergency, especially in response to attacks by Native Americans.

By the outbreak of the American Revolution, Martin was serving as an appointed justice on the Commission of Peace for Frederick County. Martin was reappointed as a justice of the peace by Governor Patrick Henry, along with William Booth and Warner Washington, but all three men declined to serve another term. Martin did not swear into the committee because he refused to serve under the new revolutionary regime, initially believing that American independence from Great Britain was a futile effort. The committee had also been actively arresting Loyalists, which may have influenced Martin's decision to turn down his reappointment. Martin retreated from performing civil service entirely, and afterward retired to Greenway Court. Prior to his death, Martin became an active Freemason.

American Revolution and Lord Fairfax's death 
As a Loyalist, Martin maintained a low profile following the outbreak of the American Revolutionary War. By 1778, the Virginia General Assembly had abolished quit-rents, but in recognition of Lord Fairfax's loyalty, the Northern Neck Proprietary was made an exception. Lord Fairfax was treated with respect and consideration by the assembly, and despite being the only resident peer in the American colonies, he was accorded all the privileges of a Virginia citizen. Following the death of Lord Fairfax in 1781, his will was recorded on March 5, 1782, and conveyed his title to the remnants of his American properties, including the Northern Neck Proprietary, to Martin's elder brother Reverend Denny Martin, who then assumed the surname and coat of arms of Fairfax. Lord Fairfax devised his property and title to Denny Martin on the condition that he apply to the Parliament of Great Britain for an act to authorize him to inherit the title of Lord Fairfax of Cameron. The late Lord Fairfax had appointed as joint executors of his will and estate, Martin, Gabriel Jones and Peter Hog. Martin and his brothers Denny and Philip also inherited all Lord Fairfax's slaves. However, Martin's uncle and Lord Fairfax's brother Robert Fairfax appealed his claim to the title of Lord Fairfax of Cameron to Parliament, and succeeded as the 7th Lord Fairfax of Cameron.

Because he did not wish to leave England, Denny Fairfax appointed Martin and Jones as managers of the proprietary. As required in Virginia, they placed newspaper advertisements telling proprietary tenants to bring their claims against the Lord Fairfax estate forward and prove them. Meanwhile, one of the surveyors Martin used, Thomas Marshall, who also lived on Oak Hill plantation in the Leeds Manor tract, moved to Kentucky in 1785, but his son, John Marshall had become a successful attorney in Richmond, as well as kept up his father's Oak Hill plantation in Fauquier County. Martin hired Marshall to secure approval of the 6th Fairfax's claim to the propriety, which he did in Fairfax v. Hite (1786).  Also descendants of William Fairfax continued to assert back claims against the estates of Lord Fairfax, which had been rendered by William Fairfax prior to 1757. In order to absolve himself of these back claims, Denny Fairfax renounced his appointments of Martin and Jones, and instead appointed Bryan Fairfax, 8th Lord Fairfax of Cameron as the sole steward of the proprietary in an official transposition in London on September 21, 1784.

Because Denny Fairfax was a British subject residing in England, Virginians argued he and other British relatives were "alien enemies", and thus escheat laws could confiscate his Virginia property. In 1785, the Virginia General Assembly ordered that all records, books, and documents pertaining to the proprietary's lands be confiscated by the state of Virginia and removed to the Virginia State Land Registrar's Office in Richmond. Virginia seized the remaining proprietary lands that had not yet been granted, although citizens who had already acquired grants from the proprietary could keep their land. In 1786, governor Patrick Henry began selling some of the confiscated undeveloped lands, which soon led to rounds of litigation which reached the Virginia Court of Appeals, then the U.S. Supreme Court after Martin's death, as Fairfax's Devisee v. Hunter's Lessee (1813) and Martin v. Hunter's Lessee (1816). Despite considerable litigation in Virginia, land values in the Northern Neck Proprietary continued to increase, and Thomas Marshall was only one of many who kept moving westward to the new frontier, as Martin noted in a 1790 letter: "The emigration of inhabitants is... astonishing..

Personal life, death and legacy 
Following the death of Lord Fairfax in 1781, Martin took his uncle's housekeeper Mrs. Crawford as his mistress, and fathered a daughter by her. Mrs. Crawford remained Martin's mistress for several years until her death. Their daughter married British captain Francis Geldart; however, she died without issue soon after their marriage, and Martin gave Geldart  of Greenway Court and a number of slaves. Following the death of his daughter, Martin employed housekeeper Betsy Powers at Greenway Court. Martin died unmarried in 1798, and his will dated July 24, 1794, was proved on October 1, 1798. In it, he bequeathed his Greenway Court estate and an adjoining  to his housekeeper Betsy Powers. Powers also inherited "all houses thereon, household goods (except plate and watch), one half of stock of horses, cattle, sheep and hogs and choice of ten slaves". Martin's living sisters Frances, Sybilla, and Anna Susanna Martin received "all moneys, and remainder of personal property" not bequeathed to Powers. Each of the executors of Martin's will received ten guineas. Following Martin's death, Powers married W. Carnagy.

As litigation in Virginia proceeded, Martin's brother Denny Fairfax did not want to move there to defeat the escheat actions. Instead, he negotiated with James Markham Marshall, who visited England in the winter of 1793, and represented a Marshall family coalition that wanted to buy the Leeds Manor and South Branch tracts, but did not have financing. After John Marshall negotiated a deal and the Virginia General Assembly passed a law, the Marshall group secured temporary financing, so on August 30, 1797, Martin conveyed title to "all and every of those divers tracts, pieces and parcels of land, being part and parcel of the proprietary of the Northern Neck of Va., with all beneficial right and interest of whatsoever nature the same may be". The Marshall group then conveyed its interest in the undeveloped lands to the Commonwealth of Virginia. These conveyances would terminate the Fairfax and Martin families' interest in the proprietary. In 1799, the Virginia General Assembly authorized Marshall as the legal titleholder of Fairfax's remaining landholdings. However, the Marshall coalition did not complete their final payment until 1806, when the Northern Neck Proprietary was officially dissolved and Virginia again became legal owner of the undeveloped lands.

Proprietor Adam Stephen, a close personal friend of Martin, had the town of Martinsburg in Berkeley County formally established by the Virginia General Assembly in 1778. Stephen named the town in honor of his friend Martin.

References

Bibliography

External links 

1731 births
1798 deaths
18th-century American Episcopalians
18th-century American landowners
18th-century American politicians
American judges
American people of Dutch descent
American planters
American slave owners
British emigrants to the Thirteen Colonies
British North American Anglicans
Culpeper family
English people of Dutch descent
Episcopalians from Virginia
Fairfax family
House of Burgesses members
People from Clarke County, Virginia
People from Frederick County, Virginia
People from Hampshire County, West Virginia
People from Loose, Kent
People of pre-statehood West Virginia
Trustees of populated places in Virginia
Virginia colonial people
West Virginia colonial people